Modiomorphida is an extinct order of fossil saltwater clams, marine bivalve molluscs.

Genera 

 †Ananterodonta
 †Brahcylyrodesma
 †Carminodonta
 †Celtoconcha
 †Cycloconchacea
 †Dulcineaia
 †Eurymya
 †Fortowensia
 †Goniophora
 †Junjagiana
 †Modiomorphoidea
 †Moridunia
 †Neofordilla
 †Plicatomorpha
 †Rimmyjmima
 †Saffordia
†Tromelinodonta
 †Whiteavesia

External links 
 
 
 

 
Bivalve orders
Prehistoric bivalves